Danny Lee Barber (May 8, 1955 – February 11, 1999) was an American serial killer who murdered four people in Texas in the late 1970s. He was executed in 1999. He said he had sex with the corpses of two of his victims.

Events 
Barber was arrested for raping and murdering 50-year old Janice Ingram in October 1979 in Dallas County, whom he killed after a failed break-in at her home. He had been convicted due to a fingerprint and made a confession. In May 1980, he confessed to murdering 48-year old Mary Caperton in April 1980 and the killing of another woman in June 1978.

He was sentenced to death in August 1980 for the murder of Janice Ingram. He was also sentenced to life imprisonment for the other three murders. In February 1999, he was executed by lethal injection in the Huntsville Unit in Texas. Barber's last meal consisted of two steaks, baked potato, chef salad, tea, and chocolate ice cream. He is buried at Captain Joe Byrd Cemetery.

Barber's last words were: "Hello, Ms. Ingram, it is good to see you. I said I could talk but I don't think I am gonna be able to. I heard one of your nieces had some angry words. I didn't have anything to do with the stay. I spent the last twenty years waiting to figure out what's going on. I pray that you get over it and that's the only thing I can think to say. I'm regretful for what I done, but I'm a different person from that time. If you could get to know me over the years, you could have seen it. I've got some people over here that believes that. I want to talk to my friends over here for a second. Well, it's good to see you guys. Look after Mary Lynn for me. Like I said, I've called my mother already, so she knows. Goodbye."

See also 
 Capital punishment in Texas
 Capital punishment in the United States
 List of people executed in Texas, 1990–1999
 List of serial killers in the United States

References 

1955 births
1999 deaths
20th-century executions of American people
1978 murders in the United States
1979 murders in the United States
1980 murders in the United States
20th-century executions by Texas
American rapists
Executed American serial killers
Male serial killers
Necrophiles
People convicted of murder by Texas
People executed by Texas by lethal injection
People from Torrance, California